This list of fictional cats and other felines in television is subsidiary to the list of fictional cats. This list includes feline puppet characters. It is restricted solely to notable feline characters from notable live action (or primarily live-action) television programmes. For characters that appear in several separate shows, only the earliest appearance will be recorded here.

See also
 List of fictional cats

References

 
Television
Fictional cats in television